Sublimation is the transition of a substance directly from the solid to the gas state, without passing through the liquid state. Sublimation is an endothermic process that occurs at temperatures and pressures below a substance's triple point in its phase diagram, which corresponds to the lowest pressure at which the substance can exist as a liquid. The reverse process of sublimation is deposition or desublimation, in which a substance passes directly from a gas to a solid phase. Sublimation has also been used as a generic term to describe a solid-to-gas transition (sublimation) followed by a gas-to-solid transition (deposition). While vaporization from liquid to gas occurs as evaporation from the surface if it occurs below the boiling point of the liquid, and as boiling with formation of bubbles in the interior of the liquid if it occurs at the boiling point, there is no such distinction for the solid-to-gas transition which always occurs as sublimation from the surface.

At normal pressures, most chemical compounds and elements possess three different states at different temperatures. In these cases, the transition from the solid to the gaseous state requires an intermediate liquid state. The pressure referred to is the partial pressure of the substance, not the total (e.g. atmospheric) pressure of the entire system. Thus, any solid can sublimate if its vapour pressure is higher than the surrounding partial pressure of the same substance, and in some cases sublimates at an appreciable rate (e.g. water ice just below 0 °C). For some substances, such as carbon and arsenic, sublimation is much easier than evaporation from the melt, because the pressure of their triple point is very high, and it is difficult to obtain them as liquids.

The term sublimation refers to a physical change of state and is not used to describe the transformation of a solid to a gas in a chemical reaction. For example, the dissociation on heating of solid ammonium chloride into hydrogen chloride and ammonia is not sublimation but a chemical reaction. Similarly the combustion of candles, containing paraffin wax, to carbon dioxide and water vapor is not sublimation but a chemical reaction with oxygen.

Sublimation is caused by the absorption of heat which provides enough energy for some molecules to overcome the attractive forces of their neighbors and escape into the vapor phase. Since the process requires additional energy, it is an endothermic change. The enthalpy of sublimation (also called heat of sublimation) can be calculated by adding the enthalpy of fusion and the enthalpy of vaporization.

Examples

Carbon dioxide

Solid carbon dioxide (dry ice) sublimes everywhere along the line below the triple point (e.g., at the temperature of −78.5 °C (194.65 K) at atmospheric pressure, whereas its melting into liquid CO2 can occur along the solid-liquid line at pressures and temperatures above the triple point (i.e., 5.1 atm, −56.6 °C).

Water
In freeze-drying, the material to be dehydrated is frozen and its water is allowed to sublime under reduced pressure or vacuum. The loss of snow from a snowfield during a cold spell is often caused by sunshine acting directly on the upper layers of the snow. Ablation is a process that includes sublimation and erosive wear of glacier ice.

Naphthalene
Naphthalene, an organic compound commonly found in pesticides such as mothballs, sublimes easily because it is made of non-polar molecules that are held together only by van der Waals intermolecular forces. Naphthalene is a solid that sublimes at standard atmospheric temperature with the sublimation point at around 80°C or 176°F. At low temperature, its vapour pressure is high enough, 1mmHg at 53°C, to make the solid form of naphthalene evaporate into gas. On cool surfaces, the naphthalene vapours will solidify to form needle-like crystals.

Other substances

Iodine produces fumes on gentle heating, although this is above the triple point and therefore not true sublimation. It is possible to obtain liquid iodine at atmospheric pressure by controlling the temperature at just above the melting point of iodine. In forensic science, iodine vapor can reveal latent fingerprints on paper.
Arsenic can also sublime at high temperatures.

Cadmium and zinc are not suitable materials for use in vacuum because they sublime much more than other common materials.

Purification by sublimation

Sublimation is a technique used by chemists to purify compounds. A solid is typically placed in a sublimation apparatus and heated under vacuum. Under this reduced pressure, the solid volatilizes and condenses as a purified compound on a cooled surface (cold finger), leaving a non-volatile residue of impurities behind. Once heating ceases and the vacuum is removed, the purified compound may be collected from the cooling surface.
For even higher purification efficiencies, a temperature gradient is applied, which also allows for the separation of different fractions. Typical setups use an evacuated glass tube that is heated gradually in a controlled manner. The material flow is from the hot end, where the initial material is placed, to the cold end that is connected to a pump stand. By controlling temperatures along the length of the tube, the operator can control the zones of re-condensation, with very volatile compounds being pumped out of the system completely (or caught by a separate cold trap), moderately volatile compounds re-condensing along the tube according to their different volatilities, and non-volatile compounds remaining in the hot end.
Vacuum sublimation of this type is also the method of choice for purification of organic compounds for use in the organic electronics industry, where very high purities (often > 99.99%) are needed to satisfy the standards for consumer electronics and other applications.

Historical usage
In ancient alchemy, a protoscience that contributed to the development of modern chemistry and medicine, alchemists developed a structure of basic laboratory techniques, theory, terminology, and experimental methods. Sublimation was used to refer to the process in which a substance is heated to a vapor, then immediately collects as sediment on the upper portion and neck of the heating medium (typically a retort or alembic), but can also be used to describe other similar non-laboratory transitions. It was mentioned by alchemical authors such as Basil Valentine and George Ripley, and in the Rosarium philosophorum, as a process necessary for the completion of the magnum opus. Here, the word sublimation was used to describe an exchange of "bodies" and "spirits" similar to laboratory phase transition between solids and gases. Valentine, in his Le char triomphal de l'antimoine (Triumphal Chariot of Antimony, published 1646) made a comparison to spagyrics in which a vegetable sublimation can be used to separate the spirits in wine and beer. Ripley used language more indicative of the mystical implications of sublimation, indicating that the process has a double aspect in the spiritualization of the body and the corporalizing of the spirit. He writes:

And Sublimations we make for three causes,
The first cause is to make the body spiritual.
The second is that the spirit may be corporeal,
And become fixed with it and consubstantial.
The third cause is that from its filthy original.
It may be cleansed, and its saltiness sulphurious
May be diminished in it, which is infectious.

Sublimation predictions

The enthalpy of sublimation has commonly been predicted using the equipartition theorem. If the lattice energy is assumed to be approximately half the packing energy, then the following thermodynamic corrections can be applied to predict the enthalpy of sublimation. Assuming a 1 molar ideal gas gives a correction for the thermodynamic environment (pressure and volume) in which pV = RT, hence a correction of 1RT. Additional corrections for the vibrations, rotations and translation then need to be applied. From the equipartition theorem gaseous rotation and translation contribute 1.5RT each to the final state, therefore a +3RT correction. Crystalline vibrations and rotations contribute 3RT each to the initial state, hence −6RT. Summing the RT corrections; −6RT + 3RT + RT = −2RT. This leads to the following approximate sublimation enthalpy. A similar approximation can be found for the entropy term if rigid bodies are assumed.

Dye-sublimation printing

Dye-sub printing is a digital printing technology using full color artwork that works with polyester and polymer-coated substrates. Also referred to as digital sublimation, the process is commonly used for decorating apparel, signs and banners, as well as novelty items such as cell phone covers, plaques, coffee mugs, and other items with sublimation-friendly surfaces. The process uses the science of sublimation, in which heat and pressure are applied to a solid, turning it into a gas through an endothermic reaction without passing through the liquid phase.

In sublimation printing, unique sublimation dyes are transferred to sheets of “transfer” paper via liquid gel ink through a piezoelectric print head. The ink is deposited on these high-release inkjet papers, which are used for the next step of the sublimation printing process. After the digital design is printed onto sublimation transfer sheets, it is placed on a heat press along with the substrate to be sublimated.

In order to transfer the image from the paper to the substrate, it requires a heat press process that is a combination of time, temperature and pressure. The heat press applies this special combination, which can change depending on the substrate, to “transfer” the sublimation dyes at the molecular level into the substrate. The most common dyes used for sublimation activate at 350 degrees Fahrenheit. However, a range of 380 to 420 degrees Fahrenheit is normally recommended for optimal color.

The result of the sublimation process is a nearly permanent, high resolution, full color print. Because the dyes are infused into the substrate at the molecular level, rather than applied at a topical level (such as with screen printing and direct to garment printing), the prints will not crack, fade or peel from the substrate under normal conditions.

See also
Ablation
Enthalpy of sublimation
Freeze-drying
Freezer burn – common process involving sublimation
Phase diagram

Table

References

External links 
 

Alchemical processes
Atmospheric thermodynamics
Chemical processes
Gases
Laboratory techniques
Phase transitions
Separation processes